Cornellà de Llobregat is a municipality in the comarca of the Baix Llobregat in Catalonia, Spain. It is situated on the left bank of the Llobregat River. It is in the south-western part of the Barcelona metropolitan area and is part of the wider urban area. It houses one of the three La Liga football clubs from Catalonia, RCD Espanyol.

History 
The history of Cornellà de Llobregat is defined by three principal factors: its proximity to the city of Barcelona, its being an area of passage (as was the entire Comarca of Baix Llobregat) to and from the capital of Catalonia, and the presence of the Llobregat River.  Its name is of Roman origin (Cornelianus) and the city's architectural characteristics possess Visigoth traits.

The first written reference to the city dates from 980 AD, at which time a church and a defense tower to ward off the Saracens already existed in the same place as the current castle (constructed in the fourteenth  century).  The city was incorporated into Barcelona's territory in the thirteenth century and, for a short time, belonged to the "Franqueses del Llobregat" in which agricultural activity was principally developed.

2017 Controversy
Cornellà de Llobregat was subject of a controversy in November 2017 as a result of an opinion piece published in Catalan newspaper El Nacional, in which the inhabitants of Cornellà were accused of being "settlers" by virtue of their immigrant (Xarnego) origin and alleged refusal to integrate or learn the Catalan language. The article claimed that the working-class "red-circle" of Barcelona, of which Cornellà de Llobregat is an example, is a bastion of Spanish nationalism where "Catalans" are stigmatized.

Transport

Demography

Notable people 
 Actors
 Adrián Rodríguez
 Marina Salas
 Recording artists
 Chicuelo
 Estopa
 Levi Díaz, winner of La Voz Kids 2021
 Radio and television hosts
 Tony Aguilar
 Jordi Évole, host of Salvados
 Sportspeople
 Reyes Estévez
 Rubén Miño
 Paula Nicart
 Daniel Solsona

Institutions 
Citilab is a laboratory for citizen innovation based in Cornellà. It is located in the former Can Suris factory building.

References

 Panareda Clopés, Josep Maria; Rios Calvet, Jaume; Rabella Vives, Josep Maria (1989). Guia de Catalunya, Barcelona: Caixa de Catalunya.  (Spanish).  (Catalan).
 Website of the city Cornellà de Llobregat
 (Oficial) Touristic and shopping info about Cornellà de Llobregat

External links

 Government data pages